Pearl Hobson (7 July 1879 in Bedford County — 4 June 1919 in Metsäkylä) was an American-born Russian actress, singer, dancer and cabaret artist.

Early life

Pearl Lillian Hobson was born on July 7, 1879 in Bedford County to Susan Hobson and an unknown (possibly white) father. In 1870, according to the United States Census, Susan and her son Pompey (born 1869) still lived at the home of her parents. However, by 1880, she had bore several other children, Pompey (1870), Claude (1872), Virginia (1874) and Romeo (birth date unknown) and was residing in a local boardinghouse employed as domestic. Pearl was never listed on the 1880 US Census, and was most likely born at another date as by the time of her death, 1883 was used as her birthyear. Eventually the Hobson family relocated to Roanoke.

In 1898, at age 19 (or 15), Pearl had migrated north to New York, where she frequently posted ads in various New York newspapers seeking employment as a live-in housekeeper. By 1900, she found as a maid for the Leventritt family.

Career

Florida Creole Girls (1902–1903)

During the summer of 1901, French actress, Nina Diva, wife of the Austrian millionaire Baron Erlanger organized the Fencing Musketeers (also known as the Fencing Octoroons and Les Mousquetaires Noirs) consisting of eleven black women, which after two months of rehearsing, opened at New York's Circle Theater (October 26, 1901). The show consisted of lead performer, Jennie Scheper (born 1877 in Washington DC), who had come from the Sons of Ham show. There was also, Bidie Hall (born 1882 in Dunkirk, NY), Edith Adams (born 1876 in Indianapolis), Ollie Fitch (born 1880 in Staunton, VA), Mattie Stafford (born 1870 in Norfolk, VA), Minnie Brown (born 1884 in Chicago, Il), William H. Ward (born 1876 in Salisbury, MO), Jennie Ward and of course, Pearl as well as two other unnamed women. In January 1902, the show played Boston's Howard Theater (January 12–18) and New York's Garden Terrace.

On February 5, 1902, the troupe departed from Philadelphia aboard the SS Belgenland, arriving 4–5 days later in Liverpool. By the time the show reached Europe, the show had lost member, now advertised as the 10 Fencing Musketeers Company. Early February through March, the toured across Germany, appearing in Bremen, Kiel and Hamburg. On April 14, while appearing in Copenhagen's Arenatheatret, the women applied for passports at the US Embassy. Later the women appeared in Stockholm's Svea-Teatern (May 1–5) and Budapest (June–July). On July 5, while appearing in the Hungarian capital, the furious women attacked their manager for not paying as a much as they were promised. The fighting became so severe that Hungarian police had to intervene.

Afterwards, the women reappeared that October in London, now managed by Geraldine de Grant, a German impresario who renamed them, Die 7 Florida Creols Girls sending them off to continue touring across the continent. The troupe later moved on to Düsseldorf's Apollotheater, Leipzig's Kristallpalast, Brussels, Amsterdam's Rembrandt Theater (November 24-December 9) and Rotterdam's Casino Variete.

In January 1903, the troupe opened in Paris at the Casino de Paris (January 1-February 23), where they were praised for their extraordinary demonstration of the Cakewalk. So popular were the women, that they were photographed at Studio Waléry, who distributed their photos as postcards for eager European and American tourists. During their sojourn in the French capital, the troupe quickly began to dissolve. Mattie Stafford quickly became a popular French attraction, Bidie Hall began her solo tour and Edith Hall probably returned to America. The remaining quartette, continued on with a month's engagement at Vienna's Ronacher Theater (March 7–31) and two weeks at Budapest's Municipal Orpheum Theater (Apr.1-15). In June, the troupe finally reached the vast expanses of Imperial Russia, appearing at a popular café-chantant in Moscow. Unfortunately, in Russia, every theater was under the power of the police. Nothing could be said or done against their wishes, and if the wish to stop any performance, why they stopped it, and that was all that there was to it. The police saw their first performance and allowed them to go on. However, after their tenth performance, the police stopped them, saying that the American cake-walk was too suggestive. On July 4, the American Consul, Samuel Smith, invited all the American performers who were in Moscow to a celebration on the grounds of the consulate. The program included, the Manhattan Quartette, Smith & Doretto, Weston of loop the Hoopology, Miss Walcott, the Florida Creole Girls Quartette and Harry Houdini (who wrote about the women in his diary).

Afterwards the troupe moved on to appear in St. Petersburg and Riga's Hagenstalna Wafaras Teatris (August 18–23). In October, the troupe were in London, appearing at the Royal Holborn Theatre before finally completely dissolving. Minnie Brown returned to Germany and Jennie Scheper adopted the pseudonym, Madagascar Girl and departed for her own solo tour.

Early Solo Career (1904–1906)

At the beginning of 1904, as the Russo-Japanese War raged, Pearl and Ollie Fitch returned to St. Petersburg to pursue their solo careers. On February 18, Pearl opened successfully at Helsinki's Nymark & Stavenow Restaurant (February 18-March 19). On April 15, she returned to St. Petersburg and applied for a new passport at the American Embassy. Immediately afterwards, she began traversing across the Russian Empire as a popular American variety artist around musichalls between St. Petersburg, Odessa and Moscow. On January 22, 1905, a large public demonstration outside of the Tsar's palace escalated into the Bloody Sunday riots. Chaos quickly ensued across the Imperial capital and soon across the Russian Empire. Throughout 1905, serfs and radicals took to the streets and engaged in armed struggle with soldiers and the gendarmerie, sailors of the Potemkin battleship mutinied at the Black Sea port of Odessa. Tsar Nikolai badly misjudged the Russo-Japanese War in the Far East, which soon lost public support and exposed the many weaknesses of the Russian military and political institutions. Defeat at the hands of 'inferior' Asians served to speed up public unrest that was becoming so serious that the Tsar was forced to end the war with the Treaty of Portsmouth on September 5, 1905. To overcome the heartbreak due to the loss of the war, St. Petersburg was overcome with forced gaiety, which Pearl joined in.

During the spring of 1906, Pearl was entertaining in Moscow as noted by her visit to the American Consulate on April 28. That summer, despite increasing violence across Russia, Pearl was in the seaside Ukrainian city of Odessa entertaining audiences at the popular famous North Hotel-Restaurant, which had a beautiful open-air café chantant in the back gardens. Odessa was a polyglot city and a cosmopolitan city, and theatrical life there was in full swing. Its population numbered 630 thousand people, a third of whom were Jews and 30 thousand of whom were foreigners - Greeks, Armenians, Germans, Romanians, Italians and many others. With its wide, straight, shady streets and elegant stone houses, it would not be out of place anywhere in the Mediterranean. The city was an important trading center and, despite its distance from two capitals, it was never a quiet or provincial city. Trendy restaurants and hotels, gourmet shops, popular cafes and several theaters enjoyed the attention of many wealthy citizens. Sailors from exotic ports mixed up with the city robbers in noisy taverns next to the commercial port. On the outskirts of the city, the coast of the estuaries was littered with villas, looking at the sparkling sea surface. Meanwhile, throughout the summer, the violence prompted many of the elite to flee to the comfort of their country homes. Soon, these same estates were being torched and pillaged nightly, sometimes entire villages would out for the looting. On the horizons, nobleman and their families could see the glow of fires and the cries of the savage mobs. That autumn, as Russia became isolated due to the sudden halt of telegraph and postal services, many American expatriates began boarding trains and ships in the chaos back towards America, or at least other safer European countries. Around September 1906, Pearl sailed to New York to wait until the violence of the revolution died down. She eventually decided to visit her relatives, spending ten months in Bluefield with her brother Pompey, a brakeman with the Pocahontas division. She also made trips to visit her other brothers, Claude in Columbus and Romeo in Roanoke. Pearl attracted considerable attention in West Virginia for owning many valuable gems and wearing a $1,500 fur coat. While in Bluefield, she also took the liberty of taking out an $800 life insurance policy with the Metropolitan Life Insurance Company.

Russia's Mulatto Sharpshooter (1907–1913)
On June 6, 1907, the 1905 Revolution was finally extinguished with brutal force. Although order was established, the issues that sparked the violence remained and fueled the peasants' desire for revenge. A tense atmosphere gripped the country. There was the constant presence of the strongly emerging left-wing movement which was bent on purging the decadence of Tsarist Russia. This was, of course, the infant Bolshevik movement, but despite this business was booming again. After the revolution, a small suffragette movement swelled across Russia. The emancipation of women brought a shift in Russian society, billowing Victorian gowns were thrown aside and replaced by fashionable unimpeding svelte dresses designed by designer Lamanova. Divorce laws were eased in response to feminine demands for freedom of choice in marriage. Throughout the summer, theaters and cabarets reopened, foreigners returned and entertainers resumed their tours through the major cities. Throughout the year, Black entertainers traveled to Russia in droves. With the exception of random artists touring Europe, very few black people have ever been to Russia, and very few of them have remained in it to live. All across the Russia, Black performers such as Belle Davis, Abbie Mitchell, Josephine Morcashani, the Black Troubadours, and the popular duo Johnson & Dean filled the musichalls with excitement every night. They treated each other cordially and invited each new fellow Negro performer into their hotel rooms for breakfasts consisting of neckbones and beans to feel more at home. In St. Petersburg, a confectioner exploited the popularity of Ragtime by issuing the latest Negro minstrel hits on records pressed into discs of hard baker's chocolate.

On August 8, 1907, Pearl returned to New York and immediately applied for a new passport before returning to Europe. Arriving back in Russia on September 17, Pearl re-established herself in St. Petersburg and by the winter had established a considerable following in Moscow during her successful engagement at the prestigious Yar restaurant. Located on the northwestern edge of Moscow, the Yar Restaurant, opened in the 19th Century, was among Moscow's most celebrated restaurants and stood out because due to its age. The Yar was considered by many connoisseurs to be the finest in Russia and of the best in all of Europe. Whenever she wasn't performing, Pearl watched from the wings as the popular Sokolovsky Gypsy choir performed beautiful Russian romance songs led by the gypsy guitarist Nikolai Shishkin. The Yar's artistic director was Afro-American, Frederick Bruce Thomas, a former waiter whom immigrated to Russia in 1899 and had worked at the popular Aumont Theater since then. He too had fled Russia during the terrible 1905 revolution and upon his return had gained a position at the Yar. It was he, who had possibly arranged Pearl's engagement at the restaurant, and was soon even managing her career. Pearl became a well loved, wealthy and respected entertainer, performing in Russian, German and French, attending films, symphonies, operas and making conquests in high society. Thousands flocked to the theaters to hear this Virginia coloured girl perform, and soon the Rubles poured in.

In 1909, Pearl returned south, to her old stomping grounds at Odessa's North Hotel-Reataurant, where posters plastered everywhere proclaimed her as Russia's Mulatto Sharpshooter.

By the beginning of 1910, Pearl was residing in a luxurious apartment at 20 Kamennoostrovsky Prospect, which was upkept by a team of servants. Several doors down from the new Hobson residence, at 10-12 Kamennoostrovsky, was the popular Aquarium Theatre. In between the nonstop masquerade balls, fireworks and festivals, Pearl sang beautiful Russian Romances and performed her dramatically orchestrated dances nightly at the most fashionable venue in the capital of the Russian Empire. During this successful period, Pearl soon caught the eye of the illustrious Count Alexander Sheremetev. Born in St. Petersburg in 1859, Sheremetev attended the Corps des Pages before joining a guard regiment and being later named aide-de-camp to Tsar Nikolai II in 1902. Like his grandfather, Sheremetev had a passionate love of music. In the 1880s, he established his own symphony orchestra, which gave free concerts in St. Petersburg. He was himself a fine pianist and head of the Imperial Court Choir (since 1901) where he worked alongside composer, Mily Balakirev. His other love was firefighting. He even established at his Ulyanka estate the Peter the Great Firefighting Brigade, which was composed of six hundred strong men outfitted with the latest firefighting technology. Tsar Nikolai II granted him special permission to quit receptions at the court whenever there was a fire, so he could ride off with his brigade to battle the flames. From his father, Aleksandr inherited more than five hundred thousand acres in thirteen provinces, one fashionable mansion on the French embankment in St. Petersburg and ten homes in Moscow (including the extraordinary palatial estate of Ostankino) where he lived grandly with his wife, Countess Maria Geiden, and their four children. He never traveled without a large entourage of servants, personal musicians and even cows from his villages to assure a steady supply of fresh milk. Surprisingly Countess Maria wasn't angered by her husband's relationship with a negress, and in fact considered Pearl a friend. It wasn't unusual for the Countess to occupy a private box on one side of the theatre while Pearl occupied one on the other side. In Moscow, Sheremetev kept up another mistress, Dagmara Karozus, a dancer at the Moscow Arts Theatre and shared an apartment on 3, Sheremetevsky Lane with several other Russian dancers, such as Elizaveta Otten. With the help of Sheremetev, Pearl developed into a well-received singer and ballet dancer, that headlined nightly at the Aquarium Theatre.

During the summer of 1911, while engaged once again at Odessa's North Hotel, she applied for a new passport on August 5. The following year, Pearl was in Kiev, performing for a week at the Apollo Theater (March 7–14).

The Great War & Revolutions (1914–1917)

On June 28, 1914, Gavrilo Princip assassinated Archduke Franz Ferdinand of Austria in Sarajevo, setting in motion the events leading to the outbreak of World War I. On August 4, after Germany invaded Belgium, while simultaneously attacking France, Great Britain declared war on Germany. On August 23, Japan entered the war on the side of the Entente. Throughout the Russian Empire, the war was greeted with an eruption of patriotic fervor. Posters appeared everywhere, calling every able-bodied man to help defend their country. Men were seen standing in long lines to enlist (or to answer the draft), boys were boarded into trucks heading for their local regiment bases. On every street corner stood a soldier. Russia entered a period of unprecedented bloody savagery which would last for seven years and claim the lives of more than ten million people. No other country paid the price for the folly of 1914 as Russia did. Since the outbreak of the war, Russia's lack of arms and ammunition was quite apparent. The shortages became so severe that soldiers were sent to the front without guns and ordered to look for them amongst the dead. Many soldiers didn't even have boots. The officer corps, half of which were noblemen, suffered terrible losses in the first battles against the Germans. In the early months of war, many families began following the action closely on a large map of Europe. Most men were away fighting on the front lines, leaving the women and children behind alone in the villages and cities. Caring for the sick and wounded soldiers became a popular way for noblewomen to do their part for the war effort. Although most of their motives were honest and sincere, there was some elements of vanity and rivalry amongst the aristocratic women to see who could house, feed and care for the soldiers more splendidly than the rest. Other nobles, such as the Sheremetev family, converted several of their properties into hospitals, organized shipments of relief packages to Russian prisoners of war, helped bandage the wounded at private infirmaries and formed organizations dedicated to helping war orphans. On September 1, the Tsar declared that St. Petersburg would from then onwards be known as Petrograd. Russian high society began basking in what would be the Russian Empire's last spectacular year and to be Russian society's greatest season. There was a feverish desire to have a good time to combat the undercurrent of nervousness. It was possibly a large distraction upon newspapers reporting on October 29 that the Ottoman Empire attacked Russia. All of Petrograd indulged in wild partying, amusement and merrymaking before the Tsarist government initiated prohibition that November (alcohol was banned for the remainder of the war). One highlight of the year was Countess Shuvalov's black and white ball, with the uniformed Chevalier Gardes in attendance. Everyone spent their evenings out at the opera and attending parties. Pearl entertained at the popular establishments, watching everyone dance the tango and downing champagne to the wailing of gypsy singers, red-clad Romanian violinists and clinking glasses. Everyone was spending money as quickly as they could because they weren't sure what was to happen next.

In January 1915, in the middle of a very cold winter, the attention of Russians was riveted to another terrible wave, reports of war in Galicia. Austro-Hungarian troops launched a counter-offensive against the Russian forces in the Carpathians. But this attack was a fiasco, and by March the advancing Russians had taken the great fortress of Przemysl, thus preparing for the march along the pass to Budapest and Vienna - the two capitals of the Habsburg monarchy. Dramatic events unfolded in the south and the Russian populace watched them, experiencing a mixture of anxiety and arousal. At this time, Russia opened a second front - in the Caucasus Mountains and the Black Sea. The Ottoman Empire was its longtime enemy, which is now united with the Central Powers. Two months after the start of the war, Turkish warships shelled cities on the southern coast of Russia, including Odessa.

On September 3, shortly after moving into a new residence at 23 Kamennoostrovsky, Pearl made sure to renew her American passport. Around the same time, Tsar Nikolai II made the disastrous decision to replace Grand Duke Nikolai Nikolaevich and assume supreme command of Russia's armed forces. From that point onwards, the military's mounting failures were blamed solely on the tsar. With the tsar off at the front, Tsarina Alexandra, along with the mysterious holy man Grigory Rasputin, took command of the government. Rasputin's murky influence and the negative public perception of the German-born Tsarina as an enemy spy fed talk of dark forces at work that destroyed Russian society's waning trust in the Romanovs. Everywhere, pamphlets were distributed claiming: "To be for the Tsar is to be against Russia!" Everyone, even Imperial family members, begged Tsar Nikolai for change and reforms to allow society a greater voice in the government, although it was likely to late by then to halt the drift towards revolution. Society's lack of trust in the government was matched by the government's distrust of the people. Convinced that the people, particularly the bourgeoisie, presented a grave threat to the crown, the Okhrana kept surveillance on the wealthy. Private homes were being monitored for subversive activities. The government feared many aristocratic women were inviting military officers in their salons and encouraging seditious talk. Government agents believed the elite's alienation from the throne a more serious threat than the one posed by the poor and disenfranchised. Many aristocrats found life in the city burdensome and many retreated to their country estates.

By mid-1916, while the mood was falling in the country, the feverish atmosphere began to penetrate into the entertainment that civilians and military were looking for. On the eve of the war came from Argentina, flew to Paris and sped around the world a new dance fashion, the Tango. During the war years, the popularity of tango increased; however, some professional dancers and singers brought ominous notes to his elegant, stylized eroticism. One couple became famous for their "Tango of Death", in which a man, dressed in a flawless tail coat, was made up in such a way that his face looked like a skull. It was a melodramatic echo of the gloomy news coming from the front. Meanwhile, on July 10, Pearl relocated again to 26 Kamennoostrovsky, this time with former troupe member, Minnie Brown residing with her.

Throughout the year, with millions of peasants sent off to the front, food shortages loomed over Russia and the rapid increase in the price of goods fueled larger and more frequent strikes in the cities. The gendarmes were becoming reluctant to repel the masses of protesters, instead many policemen began joining the crowds, shouting: "Down with the War!" Once, while Grand Duchess Xenia's automobile drove through the streets of Petrograd, a group of street kids chased the car and pelted it with snowballs, yelling, "Down with the filthy bourgeoisie!" On the night of December 16, a group of men led by Prince Felix Yusupov murdered Rasputin in an attempt to free Russia from his mysterious influence. Profoundly shaken by his death, the Tsar and his family retreated into seclusion. Petrograd became a massive lunatic asylum, discontent rising with each day. The dire food shortages, combined with the 300% inflation left Russia on the brink of revolution on the part of the lower classes.

On March 8 (O.S. February 23), 1917, over seven thousand female textile workers from St. Petersburg's Vyborg district, marched through the streets crying for bread. The shortages had left the lower class starving, cold and desperate. Banners were erected everywhere, denouncing both the war and the Tsar. The crowds began breaking shops windows and raiding bakeries. Before the day ended, as many as ninety thousand had marched through the streets before order was restored. The revolution, however, had just begun. Throughout the night, Bolshevik revolutionaries organized further strikes and marches into the city center. The following morning, more than three hundred thousand workers from the northern outlying neighborhoods, crossed the Neva river at Alexandrovsky Bridge where they pushed through several hundred Cossacks on their way towards Nevsky Prospect. The city's fine inner-city neighborhoods had not seen such chaos since the 1905 revolution. By March 11, Cossacks patrolled the streets and machine guns were positioned everywhere. Street gatherings were banned and residents were warned that the authorities were ordered to confront any unrest with force. Despite these measures, protesters filled the streets only to be met by gunfire. All the blood spilling in the streets caused many soldiers to mutiny and join the mobs. On March 12, half of the city's 160,000 man garrison had joined the revolutionaries. Prisoners across the city were released into the streets, gendarmes were murdered, courthouses, arsenals, shops, private homes and the Ministry of the Interior were looted and ransacked. Mobs killed any respectable looking men, causing many gendarmes to strip their uniforms and flee the city. At the Mariinsky Palace, government ministers met to resign from their positions before slipping out of Petrograd by nightfall. Towards the end of the day, a red flag was raised above the Winter Palace. The capital was now under Bolshevik control. On March 16, Tsar Nikolai abdicated and as their world dissolved around them, many aristocrats fled to the countryside. The old order evaporated and anarchy spread. While the Duma met at the Tauride Palace to consider how to address the chaos, a rival political power, the Petrograd Soviet of Workers & Soldiers Deputies, held a meeting in the palace's right wing. The new provincial government, in order to win the support of the Soviet and it's the leader, Vladimir Lenin, agreed to an amnesty for all political prisoners, freedom of speech, press, and assembly. They also agreed to the abolition of all restrictions based on race, class, religion, and nationality. The Okhrana and corps de Gendarmes was also to be abolished. The Bolsheviks began attacking the Burzhúi (bourgeoisie), or anyone classified as privileged. All it took was a starched white shirt, smooth hands, eyeglasses, a woman's hairstyle or even any evidence of bathing could classify a person as Burzhúi, causing an angry mob to set upon you.

After the February Revolution, on March 28, Pearl registered with the American Embassy instead of bothering to renew her passport like Georgette Harvey, Minnie Brown or any other American citizen planning to flee the country. By May, Russia was already adapting to the country's new political reality, although most activities continued as before. Although it was noted at every prestigious venue, the 19th-century opera "A Life of the Tsar" was hastily dropped from the repertoire. The Provisional Government declared broad civil liberties, it also pardoned all political prisoners, including terrorists; in addition, about two thousand thieves and murderers were released from prisons. Russia was flooded with a wave of crime - there were looting in the streets, attacks on houses and businesses. The new militia, which consisted mainly of volunteer students, was ineffective, and homeowners were forced to organize their own associations for mutual protection.

On November 7, the Bolsheviks struck again in Petrograd. Two days earlier, having changed his appearance, Lenin left the temporary asylum in Finland and slipped into the capital; he managed to convince his comrades that it was time to take power. Red troops, coordinated by Leon Trotsky - a talented assistant of Lenin - occupied a number of strategic sites in the city. That night, the Bolshevik-led soldiers, sailors and factory workers attacked the Winter Palace, the former royal residence where the Provisional Government met. A small defense force in the palace, consisting of two or three junkers' mouths and a part of the women's battalion, was suppressed after several hours of confrontation. Bolsheviks arrested members of the government; Kerensky, who had become prime minister by that time, was able to escape by taking a car at the United States embassy. Throughout the course of the October Revolution, with her artistic career suddenly interrupted, Pearl spent her time with her servants packing up her silverware, linens, furnishings, expensive fur coats, jewelry, stage costumes and musical instruments valued at about two hundred thousand Rubles.

Early December, after everything was loaded up, Pearl left Petrograd, traveling west along the Primorsky Highway into the Sestroretsky District. This narrow strip of coastal land was occupied by forests, parks and swamps with a much favorable climate compared to the Russian capital, and its beautiful beaches along the Gulf of Finland made it a popular resort destination for Russian nobility, who constructed numerous country villas throughout the area. She possibly arrived in the village of Tyurisevya (now Ushkovo), whose railway station had opened on November 1, 1916, otherwise, she would've had to stop in the town of Terijoki. It was in this village, a little area known as Harjula stood a small mountain surrounded by deep ravines and covered in ferns and arbors decorated with hazel and blue flowers. Numerous narrow walking paths led up the mountain to several observation platforms and a beautiful country mansion that had been purchased the previous year by Count Sheremetev. It was already teeming with servants, preparing for the arrival of the Count and his wife. It was from here, Pearl continued along the Primorsky Highway towards the coastal village of Metsäkylä (now Molodyozhnoye), a small Finnish village first established in 1721. In the southern part of the village, in tiny Merila district sat a quaint two-story cottage with a four-story tower attached, which became known as, Dacha Hobson. The property, surrounded by acres of trees with a remarkable view of the Gulf of Finland and the mouth of the Vammelsuu River, was Sheremetev's gift to his mulatto mistress. As she settled into her new home, she sent to America her last letter to her family, mentioning that she had survived the Revolutions and had recently purchased a new house. On December 6, Finland declared independence from Russia, immediately closing off its borders and  completely absorbing the entire Sestroretsky District into the new nation. With Metsäkylä now apart of Finland, Pearl was safe from Russia's chaos.

Finland (1918–1919)

On January 27, 1918, Finland entered into a hectic civil war, as the former Grand Duchy of the Russian Empire transformed into an independent state. The civil war was fought between the Reds, led by a section of the Social Democratic Party, and the Whites, conducted by the conservative-based Senate and the German Imperial Army. The paramilitary Red Guards, composed of industrial and agrarian workers, controlled the cities and industrial centres of southern Finland. The paramilitary White Guards, composed of farmers, along with middle-class and upper-class social strata, controlled rural central and northern Finland. The conflict finally ended on May 15, as Finland emerged as an independent, democratic republic.

In December 1918, Pearl adopted four children: Anselm (1904), Aina (1905), Vanya (1909) and Elina (1913). Their mother, Anna Maria Repatti, had lost her husband in 1914 from smallpox and was now struggling to feed all of her children. Pearl offered to adopt of the children and moved them into her home. Unfortunately, six months later,  Pearl Lillian Hobson died on June 4, 1919 at age 39 due to Typhus, although Elina Repatti believes that Pearl instead died of the Spanish flu.

References

1879 births
1919 deaths
20th-century American actresses
20th-century Russian actresses
Cabaret singers
Actresses from Virginia
Naturalised citizens of Russia
African-American actresses
American stage actresses
African-American female dancers
American female dancers
American dancers
African-American dancers
20th-century African-American women singers
Music hall performers
Traditional pop music singers
Vaudeville performers
American emigrants to the Russian Empire
20th-century American singers
20th-century American women singers
American expatriates in Finland
Deaths from typhus
Infectious disease deaths in Finland
Russian expatriates in Finland
Russian people of African-American descent
19th-century American women musicians